Campo Sportivo "Al Vallone" is a stadium in Biasca, Ticino, Switzerland.  It is currently used for football matches and is the home ground of GC Biaschesi. The current capacity is 2,850. The stadium has 350 seats and 2,500 standing places.

References

Football venues in Switzerland
Sports venues in Ticino
Biasca